Claude Noel (born July 25, 1948 in Roxborough, Tobago, Trinidad and Tobago) is a former Tobagonian professional boxer. During his career, which spanned from 1973 to 1984, Noel held the WBA World Lightweight title and the Commonwealth Lightweight title.

Early life

Born August 22, 1949 in Roxborough, Tobago to Thelma Fraser and Gabriel "Alfred" Noel. In his early teenage life, Noel began selling mangoes and other tropical fruits before branching of to boxing in 1973.

Professional career
Noel began his professional career on November 13, 1973, fighting in Port-of-Spain, he beat Art de Freitas by second round knockout. After a run of four victories Noel successfully challenged for his first title, the Trinidad & Tobago Lightweight title. The fight, scheduled for fifteen rounds, was stopped in the tenth with Noel's opponent, Fitzroy Guisseppi, unable to continue.

On June 16, 1979 Noel challenged for a version of the world title for the first time. Prior to this fight Noel had built up a record of nineteen wins and just two losses, both against Lennox Blackmoore via tenth round technical knockout. Noel and his opponent, the Venezuelan Ernesto Espana, were fighting for the WBA title recently vacated by Roberto Durán. The fight started badly for Noel as Espana scored a first round knock down. Although he was able to recover, he was knocked down once again in the ninth round and he was unable to beat the referee's count for the third knockdown, which ended the fight in the thirteenth.

Two years later on September 12, 1981, Noel once again challenged for the WBA title, this time successfully. The opponent for the fight, which took place in Atlantic City, New Jersey, United States, was the Mexican boxer Rodolfo Gonzalez. Noel started the fight well but had to withstand a strong finish by the Mexican. The bout went the distance and the scores were read out as: 145-140, 145-141 and 144-141, all in favour of Noel.

Noel's first defence of his title was on December 5, 1981 against the American challenger, and late replacement, Arturo Frias. Frias dominated the fight, which took place in Las Vegas, Nevada, before knocking Noel out in the eighth round.

Although Noel never fought for a world title again, he was able to win the Commonwealth Lightweight title and defend it twice. Noel fought ten more times after his final world title fight, losing six, most notably to the renowned Nicaraguan Alexis Arguello. Noel's final fight took place on November 2, 1984, he lost the fight, and his Commonwealth title, to Graeme Brooke by a unanimous decision.

Personal life

The Claude Noel Highway in Tobago was named for him, in favour of his sporting accomplishment.

References

External links

World Boxing Association champions
Living people
World boxing champions
Trinidad and Tobago male boxers
1949 births
Lightweight boxers